Duel Love（デュエルラブ 恋する乙女は勝利の女神）is a Japanese otome video game for the Nintendo DS by Namco Bandai Games. It was released on 13 March 2008 and the character designs and artwork were created by Hisaya Nakajo. The story concerns a female protagonist who becomes friends with the (male) members of her high school's boxing club. It is rated C for ages 15 and up by the Japanese board CERO.

Gameplay

Primarily a dating sim, the overall goal of the game is to form a relationship with the chosen character. There are also several minigames, in which the player assists the young men in training, cheers them on during matches (which affects their performance), treats their post-fight scrapes and bruises, peeks at them in the shower, gives them back rubs and wipes sweat off their chests. The game has not been announced for regions outside Japan but has received attention by gaming media for its quasi-sexual nature. In fact, in the part of the game which involves boys showering, the entire body is naked and the genitals are hidden by the gap between the top and bottom DS screens.

Characters
Jin Yuki - Daisuke Namikawa
Yuma Asakura - Jun Fukuyama
Shinichiro Nagao - Kouji Yusa
Kei Ryuzoji - Ryoutaro Okiayu
Tomohiko Tachibana - Yuuta Kasuya
Masayoshi Date - Kazuya Nakai
Marco - Junichi Suwabe
Atsushi Nikaidou - Kenji Nojima
Tetsuya Nikaidou - Hisayoshi Suganuma
Kyoji Takigawa - Daisuke Ono
Akira Shimatsu - Tomokazu Sugita
Seita Anekoji

References

2008 video games
Nintendo DS games
Nintendo DS-only games
Japan-exclusive video games
Otome games
Video games developed in Japan
Bandai Namco games
Multiplayer and single-player video games